Kangsabati River (Pron:) (also variously known as the Kãsai and Cossye) rises from the Chota Nagpur plateau in the state of West Bengal, India and passes through the districts of Purulia, Bankura, Paschim Medinipur and Purba Medinipur in West Bengal before draining in the Bay of Bengal.

Course 

The river's headwaters are on the Chota Nagpur Plateau in Purulia district, near the city of Jhalda, where the smaller rivers Saharjhor and Girgiri join together. From there, it passes through Bankura district, passing the towns of Purulia, Khatra and Ranibandh. At Binpur it is joined by the Bhairabbanki, and at Keshpur the river splits into two. 

The northern branch flows through the Daspur area, where it is known as the Palarpai. This branch eventually flows into the Rupnarayan River. The other branch, still called the Kangsabati, flows in a south-easterly direction. Eventually, it meets the Keleghai River, and the junction of the two forms the Haldi River, which flows into the Bay of Bengal at Haldia.

Kangsabati Project 

In 1956, the Indian government launched the Kangsabati Irrigation Project (also called the Kangsabati Reservoir Project) to provide water for the irrigation of Bankura, Hooghly, and Midnapore districts (the last now partitioned into Paschim Medinipur and Purba Medinipur districts). To facilitate this, Mukutmanipur Dam  was constructed at the border of Purulia and Bankura districts near Mukutmanipur, creating a large reservoir. Prior to this project, an anicut dam built on the Kangsabati River near Midnapore in 1784 was the sole irrigational structure on the river. , the dam provided water to just under  of land.

See also 

 List of rivers of India
 Rivers of India

References 

Rivers of West Bengal
Rivers of Jharkhand
Rivers of India